Back to the Mono Kero is the fourth studio album by the Japanese girl band eX-Girl, released by HIBOOM in Japan, Ipecac Recording in the US (IPC-15), 62 TV Records in Belgium, Valve Records in Australia, and Levy-yhtiö in Finland.

The line-up consisted of Chihiro, Kirilo and Fuzuki, and the album was produced by Hoppy Kamiyama.

Track listing
 "Waving Scientist @ Frog King" (Lyrics: eX-Girl / Music: Hoppy Kamiyama, eX-Girl) – 3:58.
 "Tozka" (Lyrics: Chihiro / Music: Kamiyama, eX-Girl) – 5:05.
 "Aji Fry (Fried Horse Mackerel)" (Lyrics: eX-Girl, Kamiyama / Music: Kamiyama, eX-Girl) – 4:11.
 "Pop Muzik" (Lyrics & Music: Robin Scott) – 4:51.
 "Gween-Kong-Zee" (Lyrics: Kirilo / Music: Kamiyama, eX-Girl) – 4:57.
 "Cucumber Surrender" (Lyrics: Kirilo / Music: Kamiyama, eX-Girl) – 5:47.
 "Wipe Out #3" (Music: Kamiyama) – 2:12.
 "Solid States Kerok'n'Roll" (Lyrics: eX-Girl / Music: Kamiyama, eX-Girl) – 4:22.
 "Zero Gravity" (Lyrics: Fuzuki / Music: Kamiyama, eX-Girl) – 4:35.
 "Crime of the Century" (Music: Kamiyama, eX-Girl) – 9:46.
 "Sasuke" (Lyrics: Kirilo, Kamiyama / Music: Kamiyama, eX-Girl) – 5:25.

Bonus tracks
 "Let My Name Be Swallow" – track 12 (Japanese release).
 "Swanky*Spunky*Slinky" – track 12 (Belgian release).

Personnel
 Chihiro – vocals, guitar, sitar.
 Kirilo – vocals, bass, Casiotone.
 Fuzuki – vocals, drums, percussion.
 Steve Eto – tom-tom (M-6).
 Hoppy Kamiyama – Digital President, asshole box, scum tape from garbage, Slide Geisha, metal, gram pot.

Production
 Hoppy Kamiyama – producer.
 Yoshiaki Kondo – engineering, mixing at GOK Sound Studio, Tokyo, August/October 2000.
 Masayo Takise – mastering at M's Disc, Tokyo.
 Patricia de Ruijter, Saguaro – photos.
 Kazunori Akita, Robeert Farrell – eX-Girl logos.
 Naomi Hamada, Yukari Terakawa, Reiko – costumes.
 Tomoko  Kobayasi – hairdresser.

EX-Girl albums
2001 albums
Ipecac Recordings albums